Rosa Aguirre (1908–1981) was a Filipina actress who worked for Sampaguita Pictures and Lvn Pictures. She was married to actor Miguel Anzures and mother to controversial actor Narding Anzures.

She made her first movie on 1938, Himagsikan ng Puso, with Rudy Concepcion. Aguirre completed 13 movies when World War II broke the city of Manila. Under X'Otic Pictures and Eiga Hekusa she made one film during Japanese Occupation, Liwayway ng Kalayaan (Dawn of Freedom).  In 1946, she made one war movie Death March under Philippine Pictures Inc., opposite Leopoldo Salcedo, Daily Doble, for Fernando Poe Production in 1947. Aguirre made two movies under Nolasco Bros, Siete Dolores (Seven Sorrows) and Mga Busabos ng Palad (Slaves of Hand).  Later, LVN Pictures gave her an exclusive contract until they closed in 1961.  She was also a regular on the TV show Si Tatang Kasi.

Aguirre died in 1981 from colon cancer.

Filmography
1938 - Himagsikan ng Puso
1938 - Mapait na Lihim
1939 - Pasang Krus
1939 - Gabay ng Magulang
1939 - Walang Tahanan
1939 - Ang Magsasampaguita
1939 - Takip-Silim
1940 - Magbalik ka, Hirang
1940 - Jazmin
1940 - Lambingan
1940 - Bahaghari
1940 - Nang Mahawi ang Ulap
1941 - Tampuhan
1944 - Liwayway ng Kalayaan
1946 - Death March
1947 - Daily Doble
1947 - Ina
1948 - Krus ng Digma
1948 - Siete Dolores
1948 - Mga Busabos ng Palad
1948 - Maestro Pajarillo
1949 - Ina ng Awa
1949 - Kidlat sa Silangan
1949 - Haiskul
1949 - Landas ng Buhay
1949 - He Promised to Return
1950 - Pedro, Pablo, Juan at Jose
1950 - Huramentado
1950 - Ang Magpapawid
1951 - Ang Tapis mo Inday
1951 - Satur
1951 - Irog, Paalam
1951 - Anak ng Pulubi
1951 - Bisig ng Manggagawa
1951 - Apoy na Ginatungan
1951 - La Roca Trinidad
1951 - Huling Concierto
1951 - Isinanlang Pag-ibig
1951 - Pag-asa
1952 - Matador
1953 - Highway 54
1953 - Sa Paanan ng Bundok
1954 - Playboy
1954 - Batalyon Pilipino sa Korea
1954 - Mr. Dupong
1955 - Higit sa Lahat
1955 - Dalagang Taring
1956 - Higit sa Korona
1956 - Anak Dalia
1957 - Walang Sugat
1957 - Sebya, Mahal Kita
1957 - Sanga-Sangang Puso
1958 - Faithful
1958 - Hiwaga ng Pag-ibig
1958 - Casa Grande
1961 - The Moises Padilla Story
1968 - Hari ng Yabang as Tandang Sora
1974 - Tinimbang Ka Ngunit Kulang as Lola Jacoba

In popular culture
Aguirre was portrayed by Boots Anson-Roa in crime biopic The Lilian Velez Story: Till Death Do Us Part (1995), starring Sharon Cuneta as Lilian Velez and Cesar Montano as her son Narding Anzures

References

External links

1908 births
1981 deaths
Filipino film actresses